Nelson Leirner (1932 – March 7, 2020) was a Brazilian artist. Leirner has participated in several exhibitions in Brazil and abroad. In 1997, he moved to Rio de Janeiro and began teaching at the Escola de Artes Visuais do Parque Lage. He lives and works in Rio de Janeiro.

References

1932 births
2020 deaths
People from São Paulo
Brazilian male artists
20th-century Brazilian artists
20th-century Brazilian male artists
21st-century Brazilian artists